Starwings Basel, commonly known as Starwings, is a Swiss professional basketball club based in Basel. The club competes in the Swiss Basketball League (SBL), the highest tier of basketball in Switzerland.

Its main accomplishment to date was the win of the Swiss Cup, in 2010. Eleven years later, in 2021, Starwings reached the finals of the Swiss League.

Honours
Swiss Basketball League
Runners-up (1): 2020–21
Swiss Cup
Champions (1): 2010

Current roster

Notable players

- Set a club record or won an individual award as a professional player.
- Played at least one official international match for his senior national team at any time.
 Roman Albrecht
 Ahmad Allagholi
 Joël Fuchs
 Ilija Vranic
 A.J. Hess
 Murphy Burnatowski
 Petar Babic
 Povilas Čukinas
 Dylan Schommer	
 Cheikh Sane
 Nemanja Calasan
 Deondre Burns
 JaCori Payne
 Romani Hansen

Head coaches

  Roland Pavloski: (2002–2003)
  Pascal Donati: (2004–2009)
  Patrick Koller: (2009–2010)
  Danijel Eric: (2010–2012)
  Roland Pavloski: (2012–2013)
  Viktor Mettler: (2013–2014)
  Roland Pavloski: (2014–2018)
  Dragan Andrejevic: (2018–2022)
  Antonios Doukas: (2022–present)

References

External links
Official Website
Presentation at eurobasket.com

Basketball teams in Switzerland
Sport in Basel
Basketball teams established in 2002